Richard Quinney (born 1934) is an American sociologist, writer, and photographer known for his philosophical and critical approach to crime and social justice. Quinney grew up on a farm in Walworth County, Wisconsin. After earning his PhD in sociology from the University of Wisconsin, he taught at several universities on the East Coast and in the Midwest. He was awarded the Edwin Sutherland Award in 1984 by the American Society of Criminology for his contributions to criminological theory. He is currently professor emeritus of sociology at Northern Illinois University.

Richard Quinney is also the author of several books that combine photography with autobiographical writing. He founded the independent press Borderland Books in Madison, Wisconsin. In addition to Quinney's works, the press publishes books by other notable Wisconsin authors such as Roy Chapman Andrews, Glenway Wescott, and August Derleth.

He has two daughters, Laura and Anne, and lives with his wife Solveig in Madison, Wisconsin.

Bibliography

Books—memoir, natural history, and photography

Books—academic sociology

Sources
 Bartollas, Clemens and Dragan Milovanovic. Richard Quinney: Journey of Discovery. Palgrave Macmillan, 2019.
Cullen, Francis T. and Pamela Wilcox. "Richard Quinney: Social Transformation and Peacemaking Criminology," Encyclopedia of Criminological Theory. Sage Publications, 2010, pp. 754–764.
Encyclopædia Britannica. "Richard Quinney." (2008) Encyclopædia Britannica Online. <http://www.britannica.com/EBchecked/topic/1340924/Richard-Quinney>.
 Martin, R., Mutchnick, R.J., Austin, W., (1990) Criminological Thought: Pioneers Past and Present. New York: Macmillan, 379–404.
 
 "Richard Quinney on the transformation of self and others: an interview," (2006) Contemporary Justice Review 9: 277–282
 
 
 
 
 
 
 
 Wozniak, John F. (2008) and Michael C. Braswell, Ronald E. Vogel, and Kristie R. Blevins. Transformative Justice: Critical and Peacemaking Themes Influenced by Richard Quinney. Lexington Books.

See also
 Borderland Books
 Wisconsin Historical Society
Quinney, Richard. "Elegy for a Family Farm," Wisconsin People & Ideas, Winter 2018. pp. 26–33.
Treviño, A. Javier. Clinard and Quinney's Criminal Behavior Systems. 4th Edition. Routledge, 2019.

References

External links
 Borderland Books
 Richard Quinney's Wisconsin photographs
 Richard Quinney's photographs of the World Trade Center

1934 births
Living people
American sociologists
American photographers
Writers from Wisconsin
University of Wisconsin–Madison alumni
American male writers
People from Delavan, Wisconsin